Valentin Cosmin Lipitor (born 24 February 1982) is a Romanian former footballer who played as goalkeeper. In Liga I he played for Ceahlăul Piatra Neamţ.

References

External links

1982 births
Living people
Romanian footballers
Association football goalkeepers
CSM Deva players
FC Dinamo București players
CS Corvinul Hunedoara players
Ghazl El Mahalla SC players
FC Bihor Oradea players
CSM Ceahlăul Piatra Neamț players
Romanian expatriate footballers
Romanian expatriate sportspeople in Egypt
Expatriate footballers in Egypt
People from Deva, Romania